Richard Ervins (born December 7, 1968) is a former American football running back in the National Football League (NFL) for the Washington Redskins and San Francisco 49ers.  He played college football at the University of Southern California.

High school career
Ervins attended John Muir High School in Pasadena, California, where he participated in football, baseball and competed in track and field.

College career
In college, Ervins' touchdown run won the 1990 Rose Bowl for the USC Trojans and he was the game MVP. He was teammates on a powerful 1990 USC team with Todd Marinovich and Junior Seau. His eight consecutive 100-yard performances were a USC record and this record has since been broken by former Trojans running back Reggie Bush.

Professional career
Ervins later played for the Washington Redskins as a rookie running back, he was a second on the team in rushing yards with 680 on the season (behind Earnest Byner) and helped the team win Super Bowl XXVI. In the Super Bowl, he was the game's leading rusher, with 72 yards on 13 carries as the Redskins beat the Buffalo Bills 37-24.

Ervins received several honors during his rookie year with Washington, including the PFWA all-Rookie, Football Digest All-Rookie, Pro Football Weekly All-Rookie, Football News All-Rookie, College & Pro Football Newsweekly All-Rookie, Quarterback Club’s Rookie of the year, and Washington Redskin Rookie of the year.

He stayed with the Redskins until 1994 when he moved to the San Francisco 49ers. He retired in 1995.

Personal
Ricky was adopted by Tony and Sharon Crutchfield when he was 14 years old. He now runs a business, Xtreme Xplosion, that trains high school athletes in Northern Virginia.

On August 22, 2016, The Tournament of Roses announced Bobby Bell, Ricky Ervins, Tommy Prothro, and Art Spander would be inducted into the Rose Bowl Hall of Fame in the Class of 2016. The Rose Bowl Hall of Fame Induction Ceremony then took place on January 1, 2017, outside the Rose Bowl Stadium, one day before the kickoff of the 103rd Rose Bowl Game on Monday January 2, 2017.

References

External links
 
 Ricky Ervins Xtreme xplosion

1968 births
Living people
American football running backs
San Francisco 49ers players
USC Trojans football players
Washington Redskins players
Players of American football from Pasadena, California